The 1971 European Rowing Championships were rowing championships held on Lake Bagsværd in the Danish capital Copenhagen. There were seven competitions for men and five for women, and the most successful nation was East Germany with five gold medals across the twelve boat classes. As World Rowing Championships were still held at four-year intervals at the time, the European Rowing Championships were open to nations outside of Europe and had become to be regarded as quasi-world championships. Men competed in all seven Olympic boat classes (M1x: 17 boats; M2x: 16 boats; M2-: 13 boats; M2+: 20 boats; M4-: 15 boats; M4+: 18 boats; M8+: 16 boats), and 120 boats were entered in total.

The women's championships were held from 12 to 15 August, and 49 boats were entered from 17 countries. The men's championships were held shortly afterwards, from 18 to 25 August. The men entered 116 boats from 27 countries.

Medal summary
Medallists at the 1971 European Rowing Championships were:

Women's events

Men's events

The New Zealand eight would go on in unchanged composition to win the 1972 Olympic eight event.

Medals table

References

External links
 Some NZ Rowing History – the perspective of a New Zealand spectator, including a number of photos
 Collection of photos

European Rowing Championships
European Rowing Championships
International sports competitions in Copenhagen
Rowing
Rowing